Events from the 1020s in England.

Incumbents
Monarch – Canute

Events
 1020
 Rotunda of Bury St Edmunds Abbey constructed.
 Aethelnoth enthroned as Archbishop of Canterbury.
 1021
 1022
 1023
Siward, a Dane, appointed Earl of Northumbria.
 Archbishop Wulfstan II of York writes Homilies.
 1024
 1025
 King Cnut forms an alliance with Byzantine emperor Constantine VIII.
 1026
 The Battle of the Helgeå is fought off the coast of Sweden: naval forces of Cnut's North Sea Empire defeat the combined Swedish and Norwegian royal fleets.
 1027
 Cnut negotiates a tax-free route for English pilgrims to Rome where at Easter (26 March) he attends the coronation of Conrad II, Holy Roman Emperor.
 Cnut invades the Kingdom of Scotland, forcing Malcolm II to pay homage.
 Approximate date – Ealdred succeeds Lyfing as Abbot of Tavistock.
 1028
 Cnut becomes King of Norway in addition to King of Denmark and England.
 1029

Births
 1022
 King Harold Godwinson (died 1066)
 1026
Tostig Godwinson, Earl of Northumbria (died 1066)
 1027/28
 King William I of England (died 1087)

Deaths
 1020
 12 June – Lyfing, Archbishop of Canterbury
 1023
 28 May – Wulfstan II, Archbishop of York

References